Proissans is a commune in the Dordogne department in Nouvelle-Aquitaine in southwestern France.

Population

The classical trumpeter Pierre Thibaud (22 June 1929 – 29 October 2004) was born in Proissans.

See also
Communes of the Dordogne department

References

Communes of Dordogne